Knema globularia is a species of plant in the family Myristicaceae. It is a tree found in Cambodia, China, India, Indonesia, Laos, Malaysia, Myanmar, Singapore, Thailand, and Vietnam.

References

Flora of Indo-China
globularia
Trees of China
Flora of Assam (region)
Trees of Indo-China
Trees of Malaya
Trees of Sumatra
Least concern plants
Taxonomy articles created by Polbot